Francis Rocco Prestia Jr. (March 7, 1951 – September 29, 2020)  was an American bassist, best known for his work with the funk band Tower of Power.

Biography
Born in Sonora, California, Prestia started playing electric guitar as an adolescent. When he auditioned for Emilio Castillo's band, Tower of Power, Castillo persuaded him to switch to electric bass.

Prestia worked with the band for the next three decades, before he became seriously ill in 2001. His fans and friends created a foundation in order to help pay the artist's medical costs. On December 5, 2014, Prestia underwent successful liver transplant surgery.

Rocco is survived by the loves of his life, Julian Francis Rocco Prestia and Alicia-Lyn JoAnn Prestia.

Technique and influences
Prestia was a master of fingerstyle funk, a technique in which he lightly muted the strings with his left hand to get a percussive sound, with the pitch remaining clear and accurate. That characteristic sound, in combination with a highly rhythmic approach to bass lines, makes Prestia's sound unmistakable.

Along with James Jamerson, Stanley Clarke, Anthony Jackson and Alphonso Johnson, Prestia belonged to a generation of musicians that fostered a revolution on the electric bass—inspiring the innovative work of Jaco Pastorius in the mid-1970s.  Prestia's influential style can be heard on classic Tower of Power tracks such as the 1973 hit "What is Hip". Prestia cited James Jamerson and the different musicians who worked for James Brown (particularly Bootsy Collins) as his main influences.

Equipment
Prestia's primary instruments were his Fender Precision basses (a purple transparent American Deluxe and a natural ash-bodied short-lived signature model with a reverse split pickup and a 2-band EQ). He later maintained an association with the Conklin company that provided him a custom built four-string instrument, one of the few in the company's catalog.

In January 2013, ESP Guitars announced that Prestia had joined their roster of endorsing artists. The company made reference to the introduction of their LTD RB series on May 22, 2014.

Death
Prestia died on September 29, 2020, at age 69.

Discography

As leader
 Everybody on the Bus! (1999)

With Tower of Power
 East Bay Grease (1970)
 Bump City (1972)
 Tower of Power (1973)
 Back to Oakland (1974)
 Urban Renewal (1975)
 In The Slot (1975)
 Live and in Living Color (1976)
 Ain't Nothin' Stoppin' Us Now (1976)
 Power (1987)
 Monster on a Leash (1991)
 T.O.P. (1993)
 Souled Out (1995)
 Rhythm & Business (1997)
 Direct Plus (1997)
 Soul Vaccination Live (1999)
 Dinosaur Tracks (2000)
 Oakland Zone (2003)
 The Great American Soul Book (2009)
 Soul Side of Town (2018)
 Step Up (2020)

With Other Artists
 Carmen Grillo, Both Sides Of The Coin (1996)
 Bruce Conte, Right From My Heart (1997) (bass on "Thump")
 Yoichi Murata, Hook Up (1999) (bass on "Positive Sign", "When You Leave (And I...)", "Carry On")
 Gov't Mule, The Deep End, Volume 2 (2002) (bass on "What Is Hip?")

Videography
 Fingerstyle Funk (1993)
 Francis Rocco Prestia: Live at Bass Day (1998)

References

External links
 

 Rocco Prestia at How to Play Bass
Rocco Prestia NAMM Oral History Interview (2013)

1951 births
2020 deaths
People from Sonora, California
American funk bass guitarists
American male bass guitarists
Guitarists from California
American jazz bass guitarists
Tower of Power members
American people of Italian descent
20th-century American bass guitarists
20th-century American male musicians
American male jazz musicians
Jazz musicians from California